Neubrandenburg is a railway station in the city of Neubrandenburg, Mecklenburg-Vorpommern, Germany. The station lies on the Stralsund-Neubrandenburg railway and Bützow–Szczecin railway and the train services are operated by Deutsche Bahn and Ostseeland Verkehr.

Train services
The station is served by the following services:

regional express  Lübeck - Bad Kleinen - Güstrow - Neubrandenburg - Pasewalk - Szczecin
regional express  Stralsund - Neubrandenburg - Neustrelitz - Berlin - Wünsdorf-Waldstadt
regional service (Ostseeland Verkehr) Stralsund - Neubrandenburg - Neustrelitz
regional service (Ostseeland Verkehr) Bützow - Neubrandenburg - Pasewalk - Ueckermünde Stadthafen

References

Railway stations in Mecklenburg-Western Pomerania
Railway stations in Germany opened in 1864
1864 establishments in Prussia
Buildings and structures in Mecklenburgische Seenplatte (district)